The 2017–18 Arizona State Sun Devils men's ice hockey season was the 3rd season of play for the program at the Division I level. The Sun Devils represented Arizona State University and were coached by Greg Powers, in his 8th season.

Season
Arizona State's record declined slightly from the year before, however, the team won its first in-season tournament by claiming the inaugural Ice Vegas Invitational championship.

Departures

Recruiting

Roster

As of March 20, 2018.

|}

Standings

Schedule and Results

|-
!colspan=12 style=";" | Exhibition

|-
!colspan=12 style=";" | Regular Season

|-
!colspan=12 style=";" | 

|-
!colspan=12 style=";" |

Scoring Statistics

Goaltending statistics

Rankings

*USCHO did not release a poll in week 1.

Players drafted into the NHL

2018 NHL Entry Draft

† incoming freshman

References

Arizona State Sun Devils men's ice hockey seasons
Arizona State Sun Devils
Arizona State Sun Devils
2017 in sports in Arizona
2018 in sports in Arizona